The 1956 SCCA National Sports Car Championship season was the sixth season of the Sports Car Club of America's National Sports Car Championship. It began March 10, 1956, and ended November 4, 1956, after eleven races.

Schedule

 Feature race

Season results
Feature race overall winners in bold.

 Separate Mercedes-Benz 300SLs and Austin-Healey 100s winners were declared in D Production at Cumberland.  The Mercedes ran in a race with C Production, and the Austin-Healeys in a race with E Production.
 D, E, and F Modified were classified together at Seafair; the combined class was won by Jack McAfee's FM Porsche 550.  The highest-finishing DM car was Jack Graham's Aston Martin DB3S in 2nd.
 E Modified were classified with D Modified at Seafair.
 H Modified were classified with E Modified at Seafair.
 D and E Modified were classified together for the 1-hour races at Thompson.  The class was won by Masten Gregory in an EM Ferrari.  D Modified was classed with C Modified in the sprint race.
 Separate Overall and MG winners were declared in F and G Production at Watkins Glen.
 Mercedes-Benz 300 SLs were classified separately from others in D Production at Palm Springs.

Champions

References

External links
World Sports Racing Prototypes: SCCA 1956
Racing Sports Cars: SCCA archive
Etceterini: 1956 program covers

SCCA National Sports Car Championship
Scca National Sports Car Championship
1956 in American motorsport